The men's 800 metres event  at the 1973 European Athletics Indoor Championships was held on 10 and 11 March in Rotterdam.

Medalists

Results

Heats
Held on 10 March.

First 2 from each heat (Q) qualified directly for the final.

Final
Held on 11 March.

References

800 metres at the European Athletics Indoor Championships
800